Charles, Charlie or Charley Robinson may refer to:

In arts and entertainment
Charles Dorman Robinson (1847–1933), American painter
Charles Napier Robinson (1849–1936), English journalist and story writer
Charles M. Robinson (architect) (1867–1932), American architect
Charles Mulford Robinson (1869–1917), American journalist
Charles Robinson (illustrator) (1870–1937), British book illustrator
Charles Knox Robinson (1932–2006), American actor
Charlie Robinson (actor) (1945–2021), American actor
Charles M. Robinson III (1949–2012), American author and illustrator
Charles M. Robinson (video director) (born 1984), American video director

In government, military, and politics
Charles Robinson (MP) (c. 1732 – 1807), English politician; MP for Canterbury
Charles L. Robinson (1818–1894), American politician; first governor of Kansas
Charles D. Robinson (1822–1886), American politician; third Secretary of State of Wisconsin
Charles Robinson Jr. (1829–1891), American politician; mayor of Charlestown, Massachusetts
Charles Robinson (Canadian politician) (1835–1898), physician and politician in Ontario
Charles Robinson (Medal of Honor) (1840–1896), American Civil War sailor and Medal of Honor recipient
Charles Robinson (RAF airman) (1897–1961), English flying ace in World War I
Charles W. Robinson (1919–2014), American entrepreneur
Charles Robinson (Arkansas politician) (born 1946), American politician; Arkansas State Treasurer
Charles Gepp Robinson, Royal Navy officer and hydrographic surveyor
Charles Walker Robinson, Canadian soldier and author

In science and academia
Charles Robinson (priest) (1826–1909), English academic at Cambridge University
Charles Seymour Robinson (1829–1899), American pastor and editor and compiler of hymns
Charles Budd Robinson (1871–1913), Canadian botanist
Charles Alexander Robinson Jr. (1900–1965), American classical scholar

In sport

Charlie Robinson (baseball) (1856–1913), American baseball player
Charles Robinson (Australian cricketer) (1879–1951), Australian cricketer
Charles Robinson (New Zealand cricketer) (1892–1947), cricketer for New Zealand
Charley Robinson (1925–2007), American football player
Charlie Robinson (footballer) (1906–?), English footballer, for Gillingham and Rochdale
Charles Robinson (referee) (born 1964), American professional wrestling referee
Lefty Robinson (Charles Eugene Robinson, 1891–1974), American baseball player

In other fields
Charles Scott Robinson, American criminal sentenced in 1994, release date due for November 11, 7987, see list of longest prison sentences

See also
Charles Robison (disambiguation)